Marco Tovar (born 25 May 1990 in Monterrey, Nuevo León) is a Mexican professional footballer who last played for the Monterrey Flash in the Major Arena Soccer League. In the past he has played for Juárez, Murciélagos and Irapuato of Ascenso MX.

References

Liga MX players
Living people
1990 births
Mexican footballers
Sportspeople from Monterrey
El Paso Coyotes players
Major Arena Soccer League players
Monterrey Flash players
FC Juárez footballers
Murciélagos FC footballers
Irapuato F.C. footballers
Tigres UANL footballers
Expatriate soccer players in the United States
Mexican expatriate footballers
Mexican expatriate sportspeople in the United States
Association football defenders